Izmy Ratmadja Yaman Hatuwe (born 25 June 1996) is an Indonesian professional footballer who plays as a midfielder or left-back for Liga 2 club PSIM Yogyakarta, on loan from Liga 1 club Persikabo 1973.

Club career

PS TNI
He was signed for PS TNI to play in Liga 1 in the 2017 season. Izmy made his league debut on 14 October 2017 in a match against Arema at the Kanjuruhan Stadium, Malang.

Persela Lamongan (loan)
He was signed for Persela Lamongan to play in the Liga 1 in the 2019 season, on loan from TIRA-Persikabo. Izmy made his league debut on 11 September 2019 in a match against Badak Lampung at the Patriot Candrabaga Stadium, Bekasi.

Career statistics

Club

References

External links 
 
 Izmy Hatuwe at Liga Indonesia

1996 births
Living people
Indonesian footballers
Association football midfielders
Persikabo 1973 players
Persela Lamongan players